Madruga is a municipality and town in the Mayabeque Province of Cuba. It is located in the eastern part of the province, between Matanzas and Güines. It was founded in 1803.

Geography
In 1940, the municipality was divided into the barrios of Concordia and Cayajabos, Este, Itabo, Majagua, Oeste, Sabana de Robles and San Blas.

After 1973, the municipality includes Madruga; Aguacate; Viviendas Campesinas; La Granja; Cayajabos Pipián and Flor de Itabo.

Demographics
In 2004, the municipality of Madruga had a population of 30,640.

See also
Madruga Municipal Museum
Municipalities of Cuba
List of cities in Cuba

References

External links

Populated places in Mayabeque Province

es:Madruga